Mowat is a surname of Scottish origin. Notable people with the surname include:

 Alex Mowat (1935–1995), Scottish paediatric hepatologist
 Angus Mowat (1892–1977), Canadian librarian, novelist, father of Farley Mowat
 C. L. Mowat (1911–1970), British-born American historian
 Claire Mowat (born 1933), Canadian writer of children's fiction, environmentalist 
 Farley Mowat (1921–2014), Canadian novelist, environmentalist, husband of Claire Mowat
 Henry Mowat (1734–1798), Royal Navy officer
 Jack Mowat (1908-1995), Scottish football referee
 John Bower Mowat (1825–1900), Canadian Presbyterian minister, Queen's University professor
 John McDonald Mowat (1872–1916), Canadian politician, lawyer, World War I officer
 John Mowat (1791–1860), Scottish-born soldier; Canadian merchant, politician and educator
 Oliver Mowat (1820–1903), Canadian politician, Premier of Ontario 1872–1896
 Vicki Mowat, Canadian provincial politician in Saskatchewan

See also
Mowat Block in Toronto
Mowatt

References

Surnames of Scottish origin